The Supercopa de España de Voleibol is an annual Spanish volleyball tournament played by the Superliga champions and Copa del Rey winners. It's managed by Real Federación Española de Voleibol.

The tournament was established in 1990 but it was discontinued from that year to 2002. It's played around early October.

Winners by year

Unofficial trophy.

Wins by club

See also
Superliga de Voleibol Masculina
Copa del Rey de Voleibol

References

External links
RFEVB Official website
Supercopa winners by year

Men's volleyball competitions in Spain